Amanita yema is a species of fungus in the genus Amanita, family Amanitaceae. The fungi can be identified by its pileus color of a red center that gradually fades into a yellow-hued edge. Growing only in forest outskirts in Mexico, the fungus is a critical member of the plant biome as it is a mycorrhizal fungi.

Taxonomy 
Amanita yema was identified as a species of fungi in 2001 by Guzmán & Ram.-Guill.. It was soon categorized under the taxa: Amanita caesarea complex

Description 
Standing tall with a pileus that fades from a red center to a yellow margin, this fungus stands out. With a base that ranges from a white/yellow color to an orange colored stem. Its gills, or lamelle, is also described to have a white or yellow tint. Stemming out of the soil, the fungus is often found around forest edges in Mexico. The fungus is said to have a mild odor and taste, but is pleasantly enjoyed.

Habitat & distribution 
This mushroom is found in most temperate forests in Mexico and is locally used by its natives. It strives with being locally in demand, be that in the rural areas' markets or in major cities. There is a demand for this fungus in Italy, but no trade has been made with Mexico.  As part of the Amanita caesarea complex, it is deemed to have a high cultural significance in Ixtlan.

Edibility 
This mushroom is deemed to be wild edible fungus, and are said to have a pleasant taste. It is almost always consumed with other mushrooms and meat. Although with its simplicity and rather small size, many eat the mushroom by its self. With a simple light washing with water it is ready to be cooked. It is however, a species of fungi that is avoided, as it is similar in appearance to the toxic fungal specie Amanita muscaria.  Its local abundance is low, which increases its worth both locally and globally.

Medicinal uses 
Among the Amanita caesarea complex, A. yema is in high demand for its medicinal uses. It is frequently prepared as an anti-inflammatory agent. There are other treatments the mushroom can be used for. Acting as a gastrointestinal treatment, the mushroom is boiled and its cooking water is consumed at room temperature, for renal problems.

References 

yema